Comes a Bright Day is a British film. The film was written and directed by Simon Aboud, and stars Craig Roberts, Imogen Poots, Kevin McKidd and Timothy Spall. Comes a Bright Day is Aboud's directorial debut. The film is a mix of genres: a darkly comic thriller, involving a romance set within a heist, and a story about searching for the hidden gems that make life infinitely richer.

Plot
Sam Smith, a bright, ambitious, handsome bellboy at a five-star hotel, has big dreams of running his own restaurant with his childhood friend. On a seemingly ordinary day, he suddenly finds himself in a life-or-death hostage situation with the radiantly beautiful Mary and her spirited elderly boss Charlie while running an errand at one of London's most exclusive jewellers. Against the backdrop of an armed jewel robbery that goes badly wrong, hostages Sam and Mary discover their true feelings for each other when flung together by deadly circumstance. At the conclusion of the situation, Charlie grants Sam his wish of running a restaurant by proposing a partnership with him. Mary tells her boss that she changed her plans of moving to Australia, and asks Sam to take her to a concert.

Production
Principal photography began on 16 May 2011, on location around Mayfair and at Elstree Studios near London. Comes a Bright Day was financed by Matador Pictures, Regent Capital and Lost Tribe Productions.

British fashion designer Sir Paul Smith dressed the principal cast for the film, and photographed Imogen Poots for Japanese magazine Numéro on set.

Cast
 Craig Roberts as Sam Smith
 Imogen Poots as Mary Bright
 Kevin McKidd as Cameron
 Timothy Spall as Charlie
 Geoff Bell as John Morgan
 Josef Altin as Clegg 
 Anthony Welsh as Elliot
 Ben Cura as Mr Sullivan 
 Andrew Leung as Andrews

Soundtrack
The Foo Fighters gave special permission for the use of their track "My Hero" on the soundtrack of the film.

The title track is "222" by Paul McCartney, from the special edition of the album Memory Almost Full and appears briefly in the trailer and the main film and in full over the end credits.

Europe's largest printed music publisher Music Sales supervised the music for the film.

References

External links
 
 
 

2012 films
2010s heist films
2012 romantic drama films
2012 thriller drama films
British heist films
British romantic drama films
British thriller drama films
Films shot at Elstree Film Studios
Films set in London
Films shot in London
2012 directorial debut films
2010s English-language films
2010s British films